Torgos tracheliotos negevensis, the Arabian lappet-faced vulture or Arabian vulture, is an endangered bird endemic to the western and southern reaches of the Arabian peninsula. It is a giant subspecies of the more widespread lappet-faced vulture.

Taxonomy

The bird is often assigned the trinomial name Torgos tracheliotos ssp. negevensis, with Torgos being Ancient Greek for “vulture” and “tracheliotos” meaning “cartilage-eared. The specific term “negevensis” refers to the Negev desert, a desert in Palestine where the vulture once existed.

Due to several differences form the African subspecies, it has been elevated to a full species by some authorities.

Description
The Arabian vulture is relatively similar in appearance to its African counterpart, however there are several morphological features that have been used to distinguish the two. The head of the bird has a faded, grey-ish colour  as opposed to the bright pink head of the African subspecies. Their plumage is dark brown, as opposed to its African counterpart's darker black feather. It is also noticeably larger, with a mass of about 11 kilograms in some females, in comparison to a typical maximum mass of 9 kilograms found in lappet-faced vultures in Africa. It is the beast of nations, as it is only outsized by the Cinereous vulture in its range.

Distribution

This bird has a limited range, only occupying small swathes of the Arabian peninsula. It is a resident in Saudi Arabia, the UAE, Oman and Yemen, occasionally moving throughout the four countries to overwinter. It has been extirpated from Palestine and the Sinai peninsula. A single vagrant has been recorded in Kuwait during late May 2008.

References

Aegypiinae
Birds of prey of Africa
Birds described in 1981
Birds of the Arabian Peninsula